Paulita Pappel (born 13 December 1987) is a Spanish filmmaker, screenwriter and intimacy coordinator based in Berlin, Germany. She is the founder of Lustery, an amateur pornographic site, and Hardwerk, an independent production company based in Germany. She is also the curator of The Pornfilmfestival Berlin.

Early life and education
Pappel was born in 1987 in Madrid, Spain. She was raised a feminist and became fascinated by pornography early on in her life. In 2005, Pappel completed her school and moved to Germany. She dreamed of becoming a porn star and left Spain because she felt constricted by its catholic fascist idiosyncrasy. Pappel attended Free University of Berlin where she studied comparative literature and received her Bachelor's degree in 2013.

Career
During her time at FU Berlin, Pappel discovered sex-positive queer feminism and engaged herself in the Berlin queer feminist community. Her political convictions led her to challenge societal taboos and stigmas regarding sexuality and she started performing in queer feminist pornographic films as an activist act. Pappel worked in several queer feminist productions such as Share (2010) by Marit Östberg and Mommy Is Coming (2012) by Cheryl Dunye. She also appeared in several films of the Erika Lust-founded series XConfessions.

From 2015, Pappel started to work as a producer and director for multiple productions. She is also involved in Berlin's feminist queer porn community and is considered to be an icon of alt porn culture. She advocates for a sex-positive, consent culture. Pappel also co-organizes and curates the Pornfilmfestival Berlin. In 2016, Pappel founded Lustery.com, a platform dedicated to the sex lives of real-life couples from around the world who film their sex lives and share it with the community. In 2020, Pappel founded HARDWERK, a production company as well as hardwerk.com, a sex-positive feminism platform with an extensive library of porn videos.

Selected filmography

Actress

Director / Producer

References

External links
Official website

Feminist pornography
Individualist feminists
Women pornographic film directors
Women pornographic film producers
Spanish pornographic film actresses
Alt porn
Sex-positive feminists
Sex-positive feminism
Spanish women screenwriters
1987 births
Living people